St. Michael's Church are churches generally named after Michael the Archangel and include:

Albania 
 Basilica of Saint Michael, Arapaj
 Church of St. Michael (Berat)
 St. Michael's Church, Menshat
 St. Michael's Church, Moscopole
 St. Michael's Monastery Church, Nivan

Australia 
 St Michael's Uniting Church, Melbourne

Azerbaijan 
 Church of Michael the Archangel, Baku

Austria
 Church of Saint Michael, Vienna

Barbados 
 Cathedral Church of Saint Michael and All Angels, Bridgetown

Belgium 
 Saint Michael's Church, Ghent

Bosnia and Herzegovina 
 Church of St. Archangel Michael, Veličani

Canada 
 Church of St. Michael and St. Anthony, Montreal, Quebec
 St. Michel de Sillery Church, Quebec

China 
 St. Michael's Church, Beijing

Croatia 
 Church of Saint Michael, Osijek
 St. Michael's Church (Zadar)

Cyprus 
 Archangel Michael Trypiotis Church

Czech Republic 
 Church of Saint Michael (Olomouc)

Eritrea 
 St. Michael's Cathedral, Keren

Finland 
 St Michael's Church, Turku

France 
 Mont-Saint-Michel
 St. Michael the Archangel Church (Cannes)

Germany 
 St. Michael's Church, Aachen, North Rhine-Westphalia
 St. Michael in Berg am Laim, Munich, Bavaria
 St Michael's Church, Erfurt, Thuringia
 St. Michael's Church, Fulda, Hesse
 St. Michael's Church, Hamburg
 St. Michael's Church, Hildesheim, Lower Saxony
 St. Michael, Kaubenheim, Bavaria
 St. Michaelis, Lüneburg, Lower Saxony
 St. Michael's Church, Munich, Bavaria

Ireland 
 St. Michael's Church, Ballinasloe
 St Michael's Catholic Church, Athy, County Kildare
 St Michael's Church, Dún Laoghaire, County Dublin

Italy 
 Sanctuary of Monte Sant'Angelo
San Michele Arcangelo in Pietralata, Rome
San Michele Arcangelo ai Corridori di Borgo, Rome
San Michele Arcangelo ai Minoriti, Catania

India 
 St. Michael's Church, Mumbai
 St Michael's Church, Pazhayidom, Syro-Malabar Catholic Eparchy of Kanjirappally, Kerala

Lithuania 
 Church of St. Michael, Vilnius
 St. Michael the Archangel Church, Kaunas
 Church of St. Constantine and St. Michael

Luxembourg 
 Saint Michael's Church, Luxembourg

Malta 
 St Michael's Chapel, Mqabba
 Chapel of San Mikiel Is-Sanċir

Macedonia 
 Church of St. Michael, Štip

Pakistan 
 St Michael's Church, Peshawar

Philippines 
San Miguel Arcangel Church (Marilao), Bulacan;
San Miguel Arcangel Church (Masantol), Pampanga;
San Miguel Arcangel Church (San Miguel, Bulacan).

Poland 
 Church of St. Michael the Archangel, Katowice.

Puerto Rico 
San Miguel Arcángel Church (Cabo Rojo).

Romania 
 St. Michael's Church, Cluj-Napoca, Transylvania

Russia 
 Cathedral of the Archangel, Moscow
 Saint Michael's Cathedral, Sochi

Spain 

Church of San Miguel (Cogolludo), Castile-La Mancha, Spain
Church of San Miguel (Jerez de la Frontera), Andalusia, Spain
San Miguel Church, Mota del Cuervo, Cuenca, Spain
Church of San Miguel (Vitoria), Basque Country, Spain
Church of the Monastery of San Miguel de Bárcena, Asturias, Spain

Thailand 
 St Michael's Church, Songyae

Ukraine 
 Church of the Archangel Michael, Chernihiv
 St. Michael's Cathedral (Cherkasy)
 St. Michael's Golden-Domed Monastery, Kiev

United Arab Emirates 
 St. Michael's Catholic Church, Sharjah

United Kingdom

England

Berkshire 
 Church of St Michael, Tilehurst

Bristol 
 St Michael on the Mount Without
 St Michael's Church, Winterbourne

Cambridgeshire 
 St Michael's Church, Longstanton

Cheshire 
 St Michael's Church, Baddiley
 St Mary's and St Michael's Church, Burleydam
 St Michael's Church, Chester
 St Michael's Church, Coppenhall, Crewe
 St Michael's Church, Ditton, Widnes
 St Michael's Church, Hulme Walfield
 St Michael's Church, Macclesfield
 St Michael's Church, Marbury
 St Michael's Church, North Rode
 St Michael's Church, Shotwick
 St Michael's Church, Wincle

Cornwall 
 St Michael's Mount

Cumbria 
 St Michael's Church, Barton
 St Michael's Church, Isel
 St Michael's Church, Bootle
 St Michael's Church, Bowness-on-Solway
 St Michael's Church, Burgh by Sands
 St Mary and St Michael's Church, Great Urswick
 St Michael's Church, Muncaster
 St Michael's Church, Pennington
 St Michael's Church, Torpenhow
 St Michael's Church, Workington

Derbyshire 
 St Michael and All Angels' Church, Hathersage

Devon 
 St Michael's Church, Axmouth

Dorset 
  St Michael's Church, Bournemouth
  St Michael's Church, Lyme Regis

East Sussex 
 St Michael's Church, Brighton

Essex 
 St Michael's Church, Aveley
 St Michael's Church, Berechurch

Gloucestershire 
 St Michael's Church, Duntisbourne Rouse
 St Michael and St Martin's Church, Eastleach Martin

Greater Manchester 
 St Michael's Church, Middleton
 St Michael and All Angels Church, Mottram

Hampshire 
 St Michael's Church, Basingstoke
 St. Michael's Church, Southampton

Herefordshire 
 St Michael's Church, Michaelchurch

Hertfordshire 
 St Michael's Church, St Albans

Isle of Wight 
 Church of St Michael the Archangel, Shalfleet

Kent 
 St Michael's Church, East Peckham
 St Michael the Archangel Church, Chatham

Lancashire 
 St Michael's Church, Aughton
 Church of St Mary and St Michael, Bonds
 St Michael's Church, Bracewell
 St Michael's Church, Cockerham
 St Michael's Church, Grimsargh
 St Michael's Church, Kirkham
 St Michael's Chapel, Lancaster Moor Hospital
 St Michael's Church, St Michael's on Wyre
 St Michael's Church, Whittington

Leicestershire 
 St Michael's Church, Stretton en le Field

Lincolnshire 
 St Michael's Church, Buslingthorpe

London 
 St Michael Bassishaw
 St Michael, Cornhill
 St Michael Paternoster Royal
 St Michael Queenhithe
 St Michael Wood Street
 St Michael's Church, Camden Town
 St Michael's Church, Chester Square
 St Michael's Church, Highgate

Merseyside 
 St Michael's Church, Aigburth, Liverpool
 St Michael's Church, Garston, Liverpool

Norfolk 
 St Michael the Archangel's Church, Booton

Northamptonshire 
 St Michael's Church, Upton, Northampton

Nottinghamshire 
 St Michael's Church, Cotham
 St Michael's Church, Sutton Bonington

Oxfordshire 
 St Michael at the North Gate, Oxford

Shropshire 
 St Michael's Church, High Ercall
 St Michael's Church, Upton Cressett

Somerset 
 St Michael's Church, Bath
 Church of St Michael the Archangel, Compton Martin
 St Michael's Church, Monkton Combe
 Church of St Michael, Wayford

Suffolk 
 Church of St Michael the Archangel, Framlingham

West Midlands 
 St Michael's Church, Handsworth
 St Michael's Catholic Church, Moor Street, Birmingham

Wiltshire 
 St Michael's Church, Melksham

Worcestershire 
St Michael's Church, Bricklehampton
 St Michael's Church, Churchill

Yorkshire 
 St Michael le Belfrey, York
 St Michael's Church, Cowthorpe, North Yorkshire
 St Michael's Church, Kirkby Malham, North Yorkshire

Scotland 
 St Michael's Parish Church, Linlithgow, West Lothian

Wales 
 St Michael's Church, Brynford, Flintshire
 Church of St Michael, Cilycwm, Carmarthenshire
 St Michael's Church, Llanfihangel Din Sylwy, Anglesey
 St Michael's Church, Llanvihangel Crucorney, Monmouthshire
 St Michael's Church, Llanfihangel Tor-y-Mynydd, Monmouthshire
 St Michael's Church, Llantarnam, Torfaen
 St Michael's Church, Manafon, Powys
 St Michael's Church, Myddfai, Carmarthenshire
 St Michael's Church, Penbryn, Ceredigion
 St Michael's Church, Penrhoslligwy, Anglesey
 St Michael's Church, Tremain, Ceredigion

Isle of Man 
 St Michael's Church, Kirk Michael, Michael, Isle of Man

United States

Alaska 
 St. Michael the Archangel Church (Cordova, Alaska)

Connecticut 
 St. Michael the Archangel's Parish (Bridgeport, Connecticut)

Florida 
 Basilica of St. Michael the Archangel (Pensacola, Florida)

Hawaii 
 St. Michael the Archangel Church (Kailua-Kona, Hawaii)
 Saint Michael Catholic Church in Waialua

Illinois 
 Saint Michael the Archangel Catholic Church (Chicago)
 St. Michael's Church, Old Town, Chicago
 Saint Michael's Catholic Church (Galena, Illinois)

Iowa 
 St. Michael's Catholic Church (Holbrook, Iowa)

Maryland 
 St. Michael the Archangel Ukrainian Catholic Church, Overlea
 St. Michael's Church Complex, Baltimore
 St. Michael's Church (Reisterstown, Maryland)

Massachusetts 
 St. Michael's Church (Marblehead, Massachusetts)

New Jersey 
 St. Michael's Church (Trenton, New Jersey)

New York 
 Church of St. Michael (34th Street, Manhattan), New York City
 St. Michael's Church (Brooklyn), New York City
 St. Michael's Episcopal Church (Manhattan), New York City
 Saint Michael's Church (Rochester, New York)

North Dakota 
 St. Michael's Church (Grand Forks, North Dakota)

Ohio 
 St. Michael and All Angels Episcopal Church, Cincinnati
 St. Michael the Archangel Church (Cincinnati, Ohio)
 St. Michael the Archangel Church (Cleveland, Ohio)
 St. Michael Byzantine Catholic Church Toledo, Toledo
 Saint Michael's of the Ridge Roman Catholic Church, Toledo
 St. Michael Church, Fort Loramie

Rhode Island 
 St. Michael's Roman Catholic Church, Convent, Rectory, and School

South Carolina 
 St. Michael's Episcopal Church (Charleston, South Carolina)

Tennessee 
 St. Michael's Catholic Church (Cedar Hill, Tennessee)

See also 

 Cathedral of Saint Michael (disambiguation)
 Michaelion
 Saint Michael (disambiguation)
 St. Michael's Catholic Church (disambiguation)
 St. Michael's Episcopal Church (disambiguation)
 St. Michael and All Angels Church (disambiguation)
 St. Mary and St. Michael's Church (disambiguation)